Keys to the World is the third studio album by English singer-songwriter Richard Ashcroft. It was released 23 January 2006, reaching number 2 in the UK Albums Chart (see 2006 in British music). Ashcroft worked on the album at State of the Ark Studios and Julian Kershaw wrote string arrangements for some of the songs later recorded by London Metropolitan Orchestra. Strings are featured on eight songs on the album which also features electric viola on some tracks – played by Bruce White. The engineer/producer of this album was Chris Potter, and being his final solo album for a decade, until These People (2016).

Release and reception
Keys to the World was met with "mixed or average" reviews from critics. At Metacritic, which assigns a weighted average rating out of 100 to reviews from mainstream publications, this release received an average score of 52 based on 19 reviews.

In a review for AllMusic, Thom Jurek wrote: "Three and a half years later, the Verve's former frontman is back with a record not terribly different, though certainly more pastoral and perhaps more middle of the road. The rest of the disc simply follows a formula, though it's a pleasant one. Ashcroft introduces everything else here with skeletally placed guitars, pours on the strings, and keeps the tempo on slow, slower, and slowest until the final track." At Drowned in Sound, critic Dom Gourlay wrote: "Keys To The World then is a deeply personal, occasionally lifeless but equally insightful passage into the latest chapter of Richard Ashcroft's life story. Doing what he does best but just be prepared for some very uneasy listening." Scott Shetler of Slant Magazine wrote: "Keys to the World, is his best solo effort to date, adding punchy melodies to the insightful lyrics and strong vocals that are characteristic of his music. Keys to the World is a definite step forward and demonstrates that Ashcroft is finally hitting his stride as a solo artist."

The album was certified Platinum by the British Phonographic Industry, selling more than 300.000 copies.

Track listing

Personnel
Richard Ashcroft - vocals, guitar, keyboards, design
Arnie Somogyi, John Giblin, Martyn Campbell - bass
Terry Britten - guitar, bass, mandolin
Martin Slattery - piano
Gerry Conway, Peter Salisbury, Steve Sidelnyk - drums
Jon Hunt - saxophone, flute
Richard Robson - programming
Bruce White - electric viola on "Why Not Nothing?"
Chris Parkes - French horn on "Words Just Get in the Way"
Chris West - acoustic guitar on "Keys to the World"
Yvonne John-Lewis - additional vocals on "Keys to the World"
Nick Cooper, Andrew Haveron, Andy Brown, Benjamin Nabarro, Cathy Giles, Chris Fish, Chris Vanderspar, David Juritz, Debbie Widdup, Edward Vanderspar, Fenella Barton, Helen Hathorn, Joel Hunter, Jonathan Tunnell, Laura Melhuish, Martin Burgess, Matthew Ward, Nicholas Holland, Rachel Roberts, Richard George, Thomas Kemp - strings
Julian Kershaw - string arrangements

Release details

Charts

Weekly charts

Year-end charts

Certifications

External links
Richard Ashcroft – official website

References

Richard Ashcroft albums
2006 albums
Parlophone albums
Albums produced by Chris Potter (record producer)